Dharanikota is a village in Palnadu district of the Indian state of Andhra Pradesh. It is located in Amaravathi mandal of Guntur revenue division. The village forms a part of Andhra Pradesh Capital Region, under the jurisdiction of APCRDA.

History 
In 500 BCE, Dharanikota was known as Dhanyakatakam.

Archaeological excavations at Dharanikota revealed viharas in Dharanikota and nearby areas. It is the site of ancient Dhanyakataka, which was the capital of the Satavahana dynasty that ruled in the Deccan around the 1st to 3rd centuries CE. It was also the capital of the Kota Vamsa, which ruled during the medieval period until the mid-12th century. The Krishna River Valley is an important rice-producing area. It was also an important centre of trade with other parts of India and foreign countries. The place is also famous for the great Amaravati stupa; a very large Kalachakra ceremony was conducted there by the Dalai Lama in January, 2006. Xuanzang visited Dharanikota and the Amaravati stupa and wrote an enthusiastic account of the place and the viharas that existed then. Jainism flourished in Dharanikota during the reign of Sada kings.

Geography 

Demographics 

 Census of India, Dharanikota had a population of 7,534. The total population constitute, 3,734 males and 3,800 females —a sex ratio of 1018 females per 1000 males. 725 children are in the age group of 0–6 years, of which 368 are boys and 357 are girls —a ratio of 970 per 1000. The average literacy rate stands at 66.06% with 4,498 literates, slightly lower than the state average of 67.41%.

Government and politics 

Dharanikota Gram Panchayat is the local self-government of the village. It is divided into wards and each ward is represented by a ward member. The village is administered by the  Amaravathi Mandal Parishad at the intermediate level of panchayat raj institutions.

Education 

As per the school information report for the academic year 2018–19, the village has a total of eight schools. These schools include five MPP and three private schools.

References

Citations

Sources 
 

Former capital cities in India
Villages in Palnadu district
Archaeological sites in Andhra Pradesh
Buddhist sites in Andhra Pradesh
Ancient Indian cities